Sparr is an unincorporated community in Marion County, Florida, United States, located near the intersection of County Road 200A and County Road 329. The community is part of the Ocala Metropolitan Statistical Area.

History
A post office called Sparr has been in operation since 1882. The place was originally named after Daniel Souter, a local land owner.

Geography
Sparr is located at  (29.3383, -82.1128).

See also

References

External links

Unincorporated communities in Marion County, Florida
Unincorporated communities in Florida